Glen Tapia (born December 11, 1989) is an American professional boxer.

Personal life
Tapia was born and raised in Passaic, New Jersey to Dominican immigrants from Santo Domingo, DR. He is fluent in Spanish.

Glen has a daughter named Isabella Nouvel Tapia with his partner Carolin Francheli.

Amateur career
Tapia compiled an amateur record of 130-13, he competed in the Junior Olympics, as well as placing in a number of silver gloves and junior golden gloves tournaments.  Despite this amateur success, his style was much better suited for the pros.

Professional career 

Tapia won his pro debut against Edward Smith on December 13, 2008. He scored a six-round decision win against Eberto Medina on March 26, 2011. Tapia suffered his first loss on December 7, 2013, in a brutal fight against James Kirkland in which he was knocked out. This fight prompted Tapia to go back to the drawing board, which included replacing his trainer. Since that fight, Tapia has been trained by six time trainer of the year award winner Freddie Roach, who also trains superstar fighters Manny Pacquiao, Miguel Cotto, Ruslan Provodnikov and others. Tapia scored a second-round knockout over Mike Ruiz on the Miguel Cotto-Antonio Margarito undercard at the Madison Square Garden on December 3, 2011.
On May 8, 2015, Tapia lost to Michel Soro.

Professional record 

|- style="margin:0.5em auto; font-size:95%;"
|align="center" colspan=8|23 Wins (15 Knockouts), 5 Losses (4 Knockouts), 0 Draws
|- style="margin:0.5em auto; font-size:95%;"
|align=center style="border-style: none none solid solid; background: #e3e3e3"|Result
|align=center style="border-style: none none solid solid; background: #e3e3e3"|Record
|align=center style="border-style: none none solid solid; background: #e3e3e3"|Opponent
|align=center style="border-style: none none solid solid; background: #e3e3e3"|Type
|align=center style="border-style: none none solid solid; background: #e3e3e3"|Round, Time
|align=center style="border-style: none none solid solid; background: #e3e3e3"|Date
|align=center style="border-style: none none solid solid; background: #e3e3e3"|Venue and Location
|align=center style="border-style: none none solid solid; background: #e3e3e3"|Notes
|- align=center
|Loss
|23–5
| Gabriel Rosado
|TKO
|
|2017-10-19
|align=left| Monte Carlo Resort and Casino, Paradise, Nevada
|
|- align=center
|Loss
|23-4
| Jason Quigley
|UD
|
|2017-03-23
|align=left| Fantasy Springs Casino, Indio, California
|
|- align=center
|Loss||23-3
| David Lemieux || TKO ||  || 2016-05-07 || align=left| T-Mobile Arena, Las Vegas, Nevada
|align=left|
|- align=center
|Loss||23-2
| Michel Soro || TKO ||  || 2015-05-08 || align=left | Prudential Center, Newark, New Jersey
|align=left|
|-align=center
|Win||23-1
| Daniel Dawson || TKO ||  || 2015-03-07 || align=left | CotaiArena, Macau, China
|align=left|
|-align=center
|Win||22-1
| Donatas Bondorovas || TKO ||  || 2014-10-04 || align=left | Bally's Atlantic City, Atlantic City, New Jersey
|align=left|
|-align=center
|Win||21-1
| Keenan Collins || TKO ||  || 2014-06-14 || align=left | Bally's Atlantic City, Atlantic City, New Jersey
|align=left|
|-align=center
|Loss||20-1
| James Kirkland || TKO ||  || 2013-12-07 || align=left | Boardwalk Hall, Atlantic City, New Jersey
|align=left|
|-align=center
|Win||20-0
| Elco Garcia || TKO ||  || 2013-09-28 || align=left | Bally's Atlantic City, Atlantic City, New Jersey
|align=left|
|-align=center
|Win||19-0
| Abraham Han || RTD ||  || 2013-07-12 || align=left| Texas Station Casino, Las Vegas, Nevada
|align=left|
|-align=center
|Win||18-0
| Joseph De Los Santos || UD ||  || 2013-04-13 || align=left| Radio City Music Hall, New York City, New York
|align=left|
|-align=center
|Win||17-0
| Ayi Bruce || TKO ||  || 2013-01-19 || align=left| Madison Square Garden, New York City, New York
|align=left|
|-align=center
|Win||16-0
| Dashon Johnson || UD ||  || 2012-10-27 || align=left| El Paso County Coliseum, El Paso, Texas
|align=left|
|-align=center
|Win||15-0
| Franklin Gonzalez || KO ||  || 2012-08-18 || align=left| Bally's Atlantic City, Atlantic City, New Jersey
|align=left|
|-align=center
|Win||14-0
| Carlos Garcia  || TKO ||  || 2012-07-07 || align=left| Coliseo Antonio R. Barcelo, Toa Baja, Puerto Rico
|align=left|
|-align=center
|Win||13-0
| Manuel Guzman  || KO ||  || 2012-04-27 || align=left| Reverb Center Reading, Pennsylvania, U.S.
|align=left|
|-align=center
|Win||12-0
| Mike Ruiz || KO ||  || 2011-12-03 || align=left| Madison Square Garden, New York City, New York, U.S.
|align=left|
|-align=center
|Win||11-0
| Marcus Thompkins || UD ||  || 2011-09-16 || align=left| Joyce Center, South Bend, Indiana, U.S.
|align=left|
|-align=center
|Win||10-0
| Taronze Washington || UD ||  || 2011-06-25 || align=left| South Philly Arena, Philadelphia, Pennsylvania, U.S.
|align=left|
|-align=center
|Win||9-0
| Eberto Medina || UD ||  || 2011-03-26 || align=left| Boardwalk Hall, Atlantic City, New Jersey, U.S.
|align=left|
|-align=center
|Win||8-0
| Quinton Whitaker || UD ||  || 2010-10-30 || align=left| Bally's Atlantic City, Atlantic City, New Jersey, U.S.
|align=left|
|-align=center
|Win||7-0
| Nick Runningbear|| TKO ||  || 2010-06-12 || align=left| Madison Square Garden, New York City, New York, U.S.
|align=left|
|-align=center
|Win||6-0
| James Winchester || UD ||  || 2010-04-17 || align=left| Boardwalk Hall, Atlantic City, New Jersey, U.S.
|align=left|
|-align=center
|Win||5-0
| Carlos Rodriguez || RTD ||  || 2010-03-20 || align=left| Mallory Square, Key West, Florida, U.S.
|align=left|
|-align=center
|Win||4-0
| Tyrone Miles || TKO ||  || 2010-02-27 || align=left| Bally's Atlantic City, Atlantic City, New Jersey, U.S.
|align=left|
|-align=center
|Win||3-0
| David Lopez|| UD ||  || 2009-06-13  || align=left| Madison Square Garden, New York City, New York, U.S.
|align=left|
|-align=center
|Win||2-0
| Juan Carlos De Leon|| TKO ||  || 2009-05-01  || align=left| Hard Rock Hotel and Casino, Las Vegas, Nevada, U.S.
|align=left|
|-align=center
|Win||1-0
| Edward Smith || TKO ||  || 2008-12-13 || align=left| Boardwalk Hall, Atlantic City, New Jersey, U.S.
|align=left|
|-align=center

Sparring partners 

Tapia gained some notoriety in the fall of 2010 when he performed well as a sparring partner for Manny Pacquiao while Pacquiao was getting ready to fight Antonio Margarito.

References

External links

 Top Rank Bio

Living people
1989 births
American male boxers
American sportspeople of Dominican Republic descent
Boxers from New Jersey
Sportspeople from Passaic, New Jersey
Middleweight boxers